Riho Suun (born 27 April 1960) is a former Estonian cyclist. He represented the Soviet Union at the road race of the 1988 Summer Olympics.

References

1960 births
Living people
Estonian male cyclists
Soviet male cyclists
Olympic cyclists of the Soviet Union
Cyclists at the 1988 Summer Olympics
Sportspeople from Tartu